"Lovin' U" is the eighth single by melody. under the Toy's Factory label released November 8, 2006. The single stayed on the Oricon for 3 weeks and peaked at number 16. To date, the single has sold 15,434 copies.

Track listing
 Lovin' U (4:33)
 Our Journey (4:26)
 Feel the Rush (4:29)
 Feel the Rush (Junkie XL Remix) (4:46)

2006 singles
2006 songs
Melody (Japanese singer) songs
Toy's Factory singles